Bellevue Hill may refer to several places:

Bellevue Hill, New South Wales
Bellevue Hill, Boston, the highest point in the city of Boston